= Realm of Thought =

- Founded: September 20, 1999
- Dissolved: October 14, 2000
- Founder: Li Yonggang
- Website: www.sixiang.com
- Current status: Shut down

The Realm of Thought, or Field of Ideas, whose domain name was www.sixiang.com, was a mainland China-based thoughtful academic website founded by Li Yonggang, a lecturer of the Department of Political Science at Nanjing University, on September 20, 1999.

Realm of Thought primarily discussed academic ideas and some hot academic topics, and was quite popular among Chinese intellectuals. The site provided a platform for free academic discussion in China, and was once the most influential website in the humanities and academic circles of mainland China.

== Shut down ==
Realm of Thought was shut down on October 14, 2000.
